Jim Branagan (born 3 July 1955) is an English former footballer who played in the Football League as a full back for Oldham Athletic, Huddersfield Town, Blackburn Rovers, Preston North End and York City, and also in South Africa for Cape Town City.

Born in Urmston, Lancashire, Branagan began his professional career at Oldham Athletic, aged 18. He retired in 1989, later working at a Tesco store in Pendleton, Greater Manchester.

References

1955 births
Living people
People from Urmston
Sportspeople from Lancashire
Association football fullbacks
Oldham Athletic A.F.C. players
Cape Town City F.C. (NFL) players
Huddersfield Town A.F.C. players
Blackburn Rovers F.C. players
Preston North End F.C. players
York City F.C. players
Chorley F.C. players
English Football League players
English footballers
National Football League (South Africa) players